Rear Admiral Sarath Weerasekara, RSP, VSV, USP, MP is a Sri Lankan senior naval officer and politician. He was a former Cabinet Minister of Public Security and a State Minister of Provincial Councils and Local Government Affairs, member of parliament and former Deputy Minister of Labour and Labour Relations. He had served as the Deputy Chief of Staff of the Sri Lanka Navy and first Director General of the Civil Security Force.

Minister of Public Security 
In March 2021, Weerasekara announced plans to ban the burqas in Sri Lanka and the closure of more than 1,000 Islamic schools over ‘national security’ fears.

Awards
In order of precedence:
   Rana Sura Padakkamam
   Vishista Seva Vibhushanaya
   Uttama Seva Padakkama

References

External links
 Sarath Weerasekara Biography

Members of the 14th Parliament of Sri Lanka
Members of the 16th Parliament of Sri Lanka
1951 births
Living people
Sri Lankan rear admirals
Sinhalese military personnel
Alumni of Nalanda College, Colombo
Alumni of Ananda College
Naval War College alumni
National Defence College, India alumni